The OPPO R15 Pro is a phablet smartphone based on Android 8.1, which was unveiled in March 2018.

Specifications

Hardware
The OPPO R15 Pro has a 6.28-inch AMOLED capacitive display, Octa-core (4x2.2 GHz Kryo 260 & 4x1.8 GHz Kryo 260) Qualcomm Snapdragon 660 processor, 6 GB of RAM and 128 GB of internal storage that can be expanded using microSD cards up to 256 GB. The phone has a 3430 mAh Li-Ion battery, 16 MP rear camera with LED flash and 20 MP front-facing camera with auto-focus. It is available in ceramic black, dream mirror red and galaxy purple. Non-Chinese versions could also get NFC and IP67 water-and-dust proof.

Software
Oppo R15 Pro ships with Android 8.1 Oreo.

References

Phablets
Oppo smartphones
Mobile phones with multiple rear cameras
Mobile phones introduced in 2018
Android (operating system) devices
Mobile phones with 4K video recording
Discontinued smartphones